"Tuesday" is a song by Trey Anastasio and the second track on his 2005 album Shine. It was recorded in mid-2005 at the Southern Tracks Recording Studio in Atlanta, GA. It was debuted live on July 24, 2005 at the 10,000 Lakes Festival in Detroit Lakes, Minnesota.

Personnel 
 Guitar, Vocals - Trey Anastasio
 Bass, Keyboards, Drums, Backing Vocals - Brendan O'Brien
 Percussion - Cyro Baptista
 Cover Photos - Phil Knott

External links
 Trey Anastasio's Official Website.

Trey Anastasio songs
2005 songs
Song recordings produced by Brendan O'Brien (record producer)
Songs written by Trey Anastasio